The Gloucester County Vocational-Technical School District is a vocational public school district located in the Sewell section of Mantua Township, New Jersey, serving the vocational and educational needs of both public high school students in ninth through twelfth grades and adult students across Gloucester County.

As of the 2021–22 school year, the district, comprised of one school, had an enrollment of 1,560 students and 108.0 classroom teachers (on an FTE basis), for a student–teacher ratio of 14.4:1.

School
Gloucester County Institute of Technology in Sewell had an enrollment of 1,603 students in grades 9-12 as of the 2021–22 school year.
Jamie Dundee, Principal
Joyann Ford, Assistant Principal
Mike McAleer, Assistant Principal / Athletic Director
Janet Wilbraham, Assistant Principal
Gregory Wright, Assistant Principal- Youth Education and Career Center

Administration
Core members of the district's administration are:
Mike Dicken, Superintendent
Amy Capriotti, Business Administrator / Board Secretary

Board of education
The district's board of education is comprised of the county superintendent of schools and six individuals appointed by the Board of County Commissioners. Members serve three-year terms of office, with two seats up for reappointment each year.

References

External links
District web site
 
School Data for the Gloucester County Vocational-Technical School District, National Center for Education Statistics

Mantua Township, New Jersey
School districts in Gloucester County, New Jersey
Vocational school districts in New Jersey